Ayyash Al-Haj Hussein Al-Jassim, a Syrian leader from Deir al-Zour city, began the armed struggle against the French colonizer in governorate of Deir al-Zour in 1925 coinciding with the outbreak of the Great Syrian Revolution in Jabal al-Arab and Ghouta of Damascus. He was sentenced by the French to exile to Jableh city with his family after they were convicted of planning and carrying out several military operations against the French forces, the latest was in "Ain Albu Gomaa". They also sentenced his eldest son Mohammed 20 years in prison on the island of Arwad, and executed his son Mahmoud by shooting with a number of other revolutionaries.

Shortly after Ayyash Al-Haj family's living in Jableh, The French authorities assassinated Ayyash Al-Haj in a café outside the city by poisoning his coffee, and prevented the transfer of his body to Deir Ezzor city for reasons of public security, He was buried in Jableh in the cemetery of Sultan Ibrahim ibn Adham Mosque where the absent prayers held for the spirit of this martyr mujahid in all the Syrian cities.

Lineage 
Ayyash was born in Deir al-Zour in 1864 for Al-Haj family from the Abo Obaid clan from the Baggara Tribe.

Personal life 

Ayyash Al-haj grew up in a national family that contributed to the struggle against the Colonizers throughout history, Therefore, Ayyash was liking his city and his homeland, and a lover of its material and immaterial traditions, and that is why he devoted most of his life to the service and protection of his city. When the Ottomans left Deir ez-Zor, Ayyash Al-Haj contributed to protecting the people of Deir ez-Zor from the chaos and the absence of security left by the absence of the Ottoman authority. He formed a local government known as Haj Fadel Government with the dignitaries of Deir ez-Zor, headed by his cousin from the Abu Obaid clan, Fadel Al-Aboud in 1918.

He established a national army from the people of the city with Mr. Omar Al-'Abd Al-'Aziz and Mr. Khalaf Al-'Abd Al-Hamid to counter the invasion of the English and clashed with them at the site of Salhiya in 1919.

Ayyash Al-Haj also contributed to resolving many conflicts and revolutions between the people of Deir ez-Zor and between them and the people of the countryside due to his close ties with the Baggara Tribes, his cousins and close friends of the Albu Saraya clan, who later participated with his sons in the formation of armed revolutionary groups against the French forces.

The French sentenced him to exile in the city of Jableh with his family members in 1925; they also sentenced his eldest son Mohammad to 20 years' imprisonment and executed his son Mahmoud by firing squad after being convicted of planning and carrying out several military operations against French forces in Syria, the most recent of which was the epic of Ain Bou Juma in 1925.

Ayyash and his family left to their exile in the city of Jableh where the people of the city embraced him and were respected him for their struggle and virtues.

Sons 
Ayyash ِAl-Haj was married to Ms. Qmorh Al Aboud (sister of Fadel Al-Aboud, head of the Deir Ezzor government), he has seven males and three females, and each of his sons has a prominent place in Deir Ezzor, Among his sons:

Mohammed Al-Ayyash 

Politician, a writer and a symbol of sovereignty and leadership in Deir Ezzor, Born in Deir Ez-Zor in 1894, early engaged in the political activity, where he founded the national movement against French colonialism and demanded the independence of Syria with some of his friends such as Sheikh Mohammed Said Al-Arafi and Thabit Azzawi. He was in constant contact with patriots and revolutionaries in all Syrian cities such as Dr. Abdul Rahman Shahbandar, who agreed with him to start armed operations in Deir Ezzor city coinciding with the start of the Great Syrian Revolution in Jabal al-Arab and Ghouta of Damascus. He founded a revolutionary group in Deir ez-Zor governorate that carried out several armed operations against the French forces, the most prominent of which was the epic of Ain Albu Juma.

Sentenced by the French in 1925 to 20 years imprisonment where he was imprisoned on the island of Arwad, was released after the issuance of the French amnesty in 1937, and died in Deir Ezzor in 1944.

Mahmoud Al-Ayyash (Abu Stita) 
He was born in Deir Ezzor in 1898 and was known for his dignity and manhood; the people of Deir Ezzor were called him "Abu Stita," Formed a revolutionary group with some of his companions, carried out many military operations against the French forces, most notably the epic of Ain Albu Juma, or what modern writers call "Denshway Euphrates."

He was an example of sacrifice, recorded great tournaments in the national struggle record to raise the national flag high, expel the occupier and crush him and teach him a hard lesson, On 5 September 1925, Mahmud Al-Ayyash was executed along with 12 revolutionaries, The execution by the French military court was carried out by firing squad in northern Aleppo.

Ahmed Al-Ayyash 
Patriot is characterized by strong personality and generosity and magnanimity; he was elected president of the Workers Union in 1932 following the "Al Meera" incident, where he led a group of men, broke locks, and opened grain stores for people that were monopolized by France, he was leading demonstrations against the French and imprisoned more than once for his nationalist positions.

Abdul Qader Al-Ayyash 

One of the prominent person of Deir Ezzor, Born in 1911 in the city of Deir Ezzor, he served as a real estate judge in Aleppo in 1936, then moved to Maarat al-Nu'man, then to Deir Ezzor, worked in Damascus as a judge, In 1941 he was appointed director of Al-Bab District in Aleppo, where he spent two years and then moved to Salamiyah District 1944. He resigned in 1943 and returned to practice law in Deir Ezzor, Besides a law, he was appointed a lawyer for state cases for several years, He was appointed as a member of the municipal council in Deir Ezzor in 1944.

He founded the Cultural House Club in Deir Ezzor in 1944, where he gave his literary and historical lectures and invited most of the Euphrates intellectuals at that time, among the guests was the great poet Mohammed Al-Furati. The club was closed during the era of President Hosni Al-Zaim in 1948, although it was owned by Mr. Abdul Qader Al-Ayyash and cover his expenses through his own money.

In 1945 he published the Voice of the Euphrates magazine at his own expense, the first monthly cultural magazine in Deir Ezzor, its articles were limited to the definition of the civilization of the Euphrates valley and the history of its cities and describe its economy and codify and highlight its famous heritage.

He founded and headed the "Adiyat" Society in Deir Ezzor in 1958; He presided over the Supreme Council for the Welfare of Arts, Letters and Social Sciences in the United Arab Republic in 1961, where he remained fighting for the codification of the Euphrates Valley civilization. He was a member of the Arab Writers Union, the Geographical Society and the Scientific Research Society at Damascus University.

He founded the first museum in the city of Deir al-Zour in 1957 and known as the Museum of folk traditions, The current Deir ez-Zor Museum still contains many archaeological collections of Mr. Al-Ayyash, which he bought from his own money and Donated to the museum. The Syrian Ministry of Culture has published a dictionary of Syrian authors that written by Abdul Qader Al-Ayyash in 1982, and the Ministry of Folklore also issued three books that written by him.

He died in Deir Ezzor in 1974 after he enriched the Arab Library with more than 117 books in the field of history, folklore and literature, President Hafez al-Assad described him in his condolence message that sent to his relative "Lost of the homeland".

The epic of Ain Albu Gomaa 

There were contacts between the leaders of the Great Syrian Revolution and some patriots of Syrian east area as Mohammed ِAl-Ayyash, who met in Damascus with Dr. Abdul Rahman Shahbandar, leader of the People's Party, and discussed with him the issue of extending the revolution to the Euphrates region and opened a front against the French to disperse their forces and ease the pressure on the rebels of Ghouta and Jabal al-Arab, after returned Mohammed Al-Ayyash from Damascus he started to arouse the enthusiasm of the people of Deir Ezzor and invite them to fight, and agreed with his brother Mahmoud to go to the Villages of the Albu Saraya clan that living west of Deir ez-Zor and which have a strong friendship with his father Ayyash Al-Haj, to form revolutionary groups with them to strike the French forces.

Mohammed Al-Ayyash managed to form a revolutionary group of thirteen armed men who were ready to take any military action against the French forces, They are:

 Mahmoud Al-Ayyash
 Hakami Al-Abed Al-Salameh (Al-Shumaitiya Village).
 Aziz Al-Ali Al-Salamah (Al-Shumaitiya Village).
 Haji Ali Al-Abed Al-Salama (Al-Shumaitiya Village).
 Hassan Al-Abed Al-Salamah (Al-Shumaitiya Village).
 Hamza Al-Abed Al-Salama (Al-Shumaitiya Village).
 Aslibi Masoud Al-Abdul Jalil (Al-Shumaitiya Village).
 Khaleef Al-Hassan Al-Muhammad (Al-Kuraitia Village).
 Lions of Hamdan (Al-Kuraitia Village).
 Ahmed Al-Hassan (Al-Kuraitia Village).
 Hameed Al-Sultan (Al-Kuraitia Village).
 Abdullah Al-Khalaf Ibrahim (Deir Ezzor city).
 Hamad Bin Rdaini – Al-Baggara tribe.

Some people worked with the French at translation centers and others. Still, they were at the service of the revolutionaries which They were bringing news to Mohammed Al-Ayyash about the situation and movements of the French and their activities and the timing of their military operations and Mohammed Al-Ayyash guides the revolutionaries to strike the French forces.

In early June 1925, the translators informed Mohammed Bey ِAl-Ayyash that a military vehicle carrying four French officers who had come from France to inspect the French military construction departments in Syria and Lebanon, accompanied by their French driver, would leave Deir Ezzor on its way to Aleppo. He instructed his brother Mahmoud to set up an ambush in the area of Ain Albu Gomaa on the road to Deir Ezzor Al-Raqqa, where the highway runs through profound valley and has a narrow stone bridge.

When the military vehicle arrived, the revolutionaries attacked and arrested the officers and took them with their car after they took their weapons to a desert called "Al-Aksiyya," and threw them with their driver in one of the abandoned wells where they died.

The French were mad for losing contact with their officers and began an extensive campaign included planes to search for them, and when they found their bodies and inquired about the informants of the names of the revolutionaries, the sent a sizeable military force equipped with Heavy guns and planes to attack Albu Saraya clan and blockade it.

French planes began bombing the villages of the clan, it was a horrific and devastating bombardment where the houses were destroyed on the heads of children and women and killed the livestock and burned farms and crops, Some civilians were killed and among them were "Hanash Al-Mousa Al-Ani," "Ali Al-Najras," and a woman who was pregnant. Many were wounded by bullets and shrapnel from planes bombs, All of this was to pressure on the people to surrender the revolutionaries.

When the French convinced that the bombing did not work, they resorted to a despicable means where they threatened to arrest the women of the revolutionaries, their mothers and sisters until the revolutionaries surrender themselves to the French, when the news arrived at the revolutionaries, they emerged from their hideouts and surrendered themselves to avoid arresting their women.

Revolutionaries were tried in Aleppo, where The family of Ayyash Al-Haj appointed lawyer Fathallah Al-Saqqal to defend her, The court heard (officer Bono) head of the French intelligence in Deir Ezzor, who said: If each of the criminals, who committed this terrible offense deserve dying once, the gang leader Mohammed Al-Ayyash deserves hanging twice.

The French High Commissioner in Beirut, Maurice Sarrail, issued Decision No. 49S / 5 in August 1925, which ordered the exile of all members of the Ayyash Al-Haj family to the city of Jableh, Mahmoud Al-Ayyash and 12 of his companions were sentenced to death. The execution was carried out by firing squad on 15 September 1925 in Aleppo. Muhammad Al-Ayyash was sentenced to 20 years imprisonment on the island of Arwad in Tartous city.

Death
Shortly after Ayyash al-Haj family's living in Jableh, The French authorities assassinated Ayyash Al-Haj in a café outside the city by poisoning his coffee, and prevented the transfer of his body to Deir Ezzor city for reasons of public security, He was buried in Jableh in the cemetery of sultan Ibrahim ibn Adham mosque where the absent prayers held for the spirit of this martyr mujahid in all the Syrian cities, He was lamented by many poets of Deir Ezzor, as the great poet Mohammed Al-Furati.

See also

 Great Syrian Revolt
 Sultan Al-Atrash
 Hasan al-Kharrat
 Ibrahim Hananu
 Yusuf al-'Azma
 Abd al-Rahman Shahbandar
 Saleh Al-Ali
 Fawzi al-Qawuqji
 The epic of Ain Albu Gomaa
 Mandate for Syria and the Lebanon
 Henri Gouraud
 Maurice Sarrail
 Syria
 Deir ez-Zor
 Adham Khanjar
 Fadel Al-Aboud

References 

People of the Great Syrian Revolt
Syrian Arab nationalists
Ottoman Arab nationalists
Deir ez-Zor
People from Deir ez-Zor
Syrian Sunni Muslims
Arabs from the Ottoman Empire
Syrian politicians
1864 births
1926 deaths
People killed in French intelligence operations